NGC 3729 is a barred spiral galaxy located in the constellation Ursa Major. It is located at a distance of circa 65 million light years from Earth, which, given its apparent dimensions, means that NGC 3729 is about 60,000 light years across. It was discovered by William Herschel on April 12, 1789.

NGC 3729 has a bright nucleus embedded in a bar which measures 0.5 x 0.1 arcminutes. At the end of the bar lies a ring with knots. The outer part of the galaxy is formed by an asymmetric faint nebulosity with condensations. It is possible that the condensation is a disturbed satellite galaxy. In the centre of NGC 3729 is predicted to lie an intermediate-mass black hole, whose mass is estimated to be between 4 and 400 thousands  (104.6 ± 1.0 ) based on Ks-band bulge luminosity. The galaxy has an inner ring which emits in far ultraviolet and H-alpha, which are considered to be markers of recent star formation activity.

NGC 3729 is member of the M109 Group which is part of the south Ursa Major groups, part of the Virgo Supercluster. It forms a pair with NGC 3718, which lies 11.5 arcminutes to the west. It is possible the two galaxies interacted in the past.

References

External links 

Barred spiral galaxies
Peculiar galaxies
Ursa Major (constellation)
Ursa Major Cluster
3729
06547
35711
Astronomical objects discovered in 1789
Discoveries by William Herschel